Syllepte holochralis is a moth in the family Crambidae. It was described by George Hampson in 1912. It is endemic to Kenya.

Adults are uniform orange yellow.

References

Endemic fauna of Kenya
Moths of Africa
Moths described in 1912
holochralis
Taxa named by George Hampson